
Lac de Chermignon is a reservoir in the municipality of Lens, in the canton of Valais, Switzerland.

Reservoirs in Switzerland
Lakes of Valais